Gerard Gabriel McGovern  is an English car designer and the Chief Creative Officer for Jaguar Land Rover leading the Group’s Design Studio at Gaydon, Warwickshire, creating concepts and new models.  A strong advocate of design's relevance to brand equity, he is a member of the Jaguar Land Rover board of Management.

Background 
McGovern was born in Coventry in 1956 where he attended primary and Binley Park secondary schools. While still at the latter, he was introduced to Chrysler design boss Roy Axe, who was to remain a major influence.
Chrysler sponsored McGovern at the Lanchester Polytechnic (now Coventry University) where he completed a degree in industrial design before attending the Royal College of Art in London, specialising in automotive design.

Early career 
While sponsored by Chrysler UK, McGovern started work at the Styling Studio at Whitley, Coventry. In 1978 McGovern began working for Chrysler in Highland Park, near Detroit, before returning to the UK as a Senior Designer for Chrysler/Peugeot; here he worked alongside Peter Horbury (later Head of Design for Volvo in Sweden) and Moray Callum (formerly Head of Design for Mazda, then Director of Ford’s Car design division). 

In 1982 McGovern rejoined Roy Axe (now Design Director) at Austin Rover Group. Through this period he worked on the MG EX-E concept car, was the lead designer of the critically acclaimed 
MG F sports car and the Land Rover Freelander (the best selling compact SUV in Europe for 7 years), and led the team that created the third generation Range Rover. In 1999 Ford Motor Company hired McGovern to head up and rejuvenate Lincoln-Mercury design.
He set up a new design studio in California and became only the second design professional to be appointed to the Lincoln Mercury Board. Among his hires was Marek Reichman, who went on to become Aston Martin Design Director.

Recent career 
Returning to the UK in 2003 as Creative Director of Lugeii, Ford’s design and creativity centre, Ingeni in Soho, London, McGovern rejoined Land Rover as Director, Advanced Design in April 2004. Explaining why, McGovern said "Land Rover fascinates me more than any other car maker because it has its roots in pure design as opposed to styling."
Ford’s Group VP Design, J Mays, noted that "Gerry is uniquely suited to this role. He's already shown the world that he fully understands Land Rover's DNA."

He joined the Executive Committee of Land Rover in June 2008, later joining the Executive Committee of Jaguar Land Rover when the two companies merged in 2013.

McGovern was appointed Officer of the Order of the British Empire (OBE) in the 2020 New Year Honours for services to automotive design.

Recent designs 
McGovern’s first introduction was the LRX concept. LRX was subsequently confirmed for 2011 production and introduced as the compact two litre Range Rover Evoque, with anticipated CO2 emissions of 130g/km. The Range Rover Evoque is the smallest, lightest and most efficient Range Rover. 
Gerry McGovern has also guided the evolution of the 2010 Range Rover, Range Rover Sport and Discovery 4, the latter going on sale globally in September 2009. He then designed the 4th generation Range Rover and 2nd generation Range Rover Sport, released in 2012 and 2013; both of these quickly became successful. He then began the redesign of the Land Rover Freelander as the Discovery Sport. His most recent designs to be released are the New Defender in 2020 and the latest iteration of the Range Rover which was unveiled in October 2021.

References

1956 births
Living people
British automobile designers
English designers
Alumni of the Royal College of Art
Alumni of Coventry University
People from Coventry
Officers of the Order of the British Empire